Malcolm Preedy (born ) is a former rugby union player, a prop who played for Gloucester and gained one cap for England v South Africa in 1984.

References

1960 births
Living people
England international rugby union players
English rugby union players
Gloucester Rugby players
Gloucestershire County RFU players
Rugby union players from Gloucester
Rugby union props